The Angke River ( or) is a  long river in Jakarta, Indonesia. The river flows from Bogor area of West Java, passing through the cities of Tangerang (Banten) and Jakarta into the Java Sea via the Cengkareng Drain. The river is connected with Cisadane river by Mookervaart canal.

Etymology
The river may be named after prince Tubagus Angke, from the Banten Sultanate, who was the ruler of Jayakarta in the 16th century. Another theory is that the name refers to the 1740 Batavia massacre in which 10,000 ethnic Chinese residents of the city were massacred by the Dutch East India Company, with many bodies dumped in the river. Ang means "red" in the Hokkien dialect, which could refer to the bloody event.

Hydrology
The average daily rainfall is 132 mm, with the peak debit at 290 m³. The river never dries throughout the year, because it connects directly to a constant source at the districts of Menteng dan Cilendek Timur in the city of Bogor, East Java. From there it flows through the territory of South Tangerang, Tangerang, Jakarta and drains to Java Sea in the village of Muara Angke (literally: "(river) mouth of Angke"), Penjaringan, West Jakarta. In rainy seasons, the river annually causes local flood, usually in the districts of Pinang, Cipondoh, Ciledug (all in Tangerang), Joglo, Kembangan, Rawa Buaya, Duri Kosambi and Cengkareng (all in West Jakarta).

Geography
The river flows in the northwest area of Java with predominantly tropical rainforest climate (designated as Af in the Köppen-Geiger climate classification). The annual average temperature in the area is 27 °C. The warmest month is March, when the average temperature is around 30 °C, and the coldest is May, at 26 °C. The average annual rainfall is 3674 mm. The wettest month is December, with an average of 456 mm rainfall, and the driest is September, with 87 mm rainfall.

Historic place

Fort Anké was built by the Dutch East India Company in 1657 at the intersection of the Mookervaart channel and Angke river. Historical names for the fort include: Anckee, Anke, Ankee.

See also
 List of rivers of Java

References

Landforms of Jakarta
Rivers of Jakarta
Rivers of Indonesia